Gennadi Mikhailovich Pechinkov is a Russian actor, director and theatre personality, known for his portrayal of Rama. He played the part of the ancient Indian king from the epic, Ramayana, in 1960 at the Children's Theatre, Moscow and is reported to be the only European professional actor to have played the role in Europe. He continued playing the part for around 40 years and has performed in front many prominent Indian persons such as Jawaharlal Nehru and K. P. S. Menon. The Government of India awarded him the fourth highest civilian honour of the Padma Shri, in 2008, for his contributions to Theatre.

See also 
 Ramayana

References

External links 
 

Recipients of the Padma Shri in arts
Year of birth missing (living people)
Russian stage actors
Russian theatre directors
Living people